Muthuswami Dikshitar (Mudduswamy Dikshitar)(24 March 1776 – 21 October 1835), mononymously Dikshitar, was a South Indian poet, singer and veena player, and a legendary composer of Indian classical music, who is considered one of the musical trinity of Carnatic music. Muthuswami Dikshitar was born on 24 March 1775 in Tiruvarur near Thanjavur, in what is now the state of Tamil Nadu in India, to a family that is traditionally traced back to Virinichipuram in the northern boundaries of the state. His compositions, of which around 500 are commonly known, are noted for their elaborate and poetic descriptions of Hindu gods and temples and for capturing the essence of the raga forms through the vainika (veena) style that emphasises gamakas. They are typically in a slower speed (chowka kala). He is also known by his signature name of Guruguha which is also his mudra (and can be found in each of his songs). His compositions are widely sung and played in classical concerts of Carnatic music.

The musical trinity consists of Dikshitar, Tyagaraja (1767–1847), and Syama Sastri (1762–1827). However, unlike the Telugu compositions of the others, his compositions are predominantly in Sanskrit. He also composed some of his kritis in Manipravalam (a combination of the Sanskrit and Tamil languages).

There are two schools of thought regarding the pronunciation of his name. The name is popularly pronounced as 'Muthuswamy Dikshitar'. Muthuswami is an extremely common Tamil name (Muthu translates to pearl in Tamil, cognate to Muktha/Moti in Sanskrit and Hindi) and is derived from Selvamuthukumaraswamy, a deity of  the famed Vaideeswaran temple in Myladuthurai. However, T K Govinda Rao explains in Compositions of Mudduswamy Dikshitar that "the word Muddayya is an epithet of Kumaraswami or Guha. Further, in the most authentic original Telugu publication of Sangita Sampradaya Pradarshini (1904) Sri Subbarama Dikshitar mentions his name as Mudduswamy. Also, in the popular composition of Dikshitar, "Bhajare re Chitha" in raga Kalyani, the "mudra" or signaure of the composer appears in the text as "Guruguha Roopa Muddu Kumara Jananeem".

Early life
Muthuswami Dikshitar was born in Brahmin family on 24 March, 1776, in Tiruvarur near Thanjavur in what is now the state of Tamil Nadu in India. He was the eldest son of the composer, Ramaswami Dikshitar who instructed in a number of subjects including the vedas, poetry, music, and astronomy. Muthuswami had two brothers, Chinnaswami and Balaswami, and a sister, . Muthuswami's father, Ramaswami  Dikshitar, born circa 1735, from an Auttara Vadama family in Virinchipuram, had moved South due to the politically troubled environment around Kanchipuram and Virinchipuram at that time. Ramaswamy Dikshithar trained in the veena under Venkata Vaidyanatha Dikshitar, who belonged to the lineage of Govinda Dikshitar and  Venkatamakhin and this is evident in Muthuswami's works which follow the Venkatamakhin raga system.

Muthuswami moved to the town of Manali, near Madras (now Chennai) at the behest of Venkatakrishna Mudaliar, a local zamindar. The Dikshitar brothers accompanied the zamindar to Fort St. George nearby where they were introduced to Western orchestral music and the violin. An ascetic named Chidambaranatha Yogi then took Muthuswami under his wing and away to the city of Benares (now Varanasi in Uttar Pradesh). There he was instructed in music, esoterics, philosophy, and yoga. He was also exposed to Hindustani classical music, particularly the Dhrupad style, which, according to some scholars, would influence his later compositions.

Upon the death of Chidamabaranatha Yogi, Dikshitar returned South from Benares and moved to the town of Tiruttani near Tirupati.

Career

According to legend, Murugan, the deity of the temple at Tirutani, placed a piece of sugar candy in Dikshitar's mouth and commanded him to sing. This marked the beginning of his career in music and also led to him adopting the mudra, Guruguha, one of the many names of Murugan.

The song addressed the Lord (and/or the guru) in the first declension (Vibhakthi) in Sanskrit. Dikshitar later composed kritis in all the eight declensions on the Lord. These are mostly with epithets glorifying Muruga in the ascetic/preceptor form and have very few references to specifically the deity in the saguna form, as at Thiruthani.

He then went on a pilgrimage visiting and composing at the temples at Kanchi, Tiruvannamalai, Chidambaram, Tirupathi and Kalahasthi, Srirangam, before returning to Tiruvarur.

Muthuswami Dikshitar attained mastery over the veena, and the influence of veena playing is evident in his compositions, particularly the gamakas. He experimented with the violin, and among his disciples, Vadivelu of the Thanjavur Quartet, and his brother Balaswami Dikshitar pioneered the use of violin in Carnatic music, now an integral part of most Carnatic ensembles.

On his return to Tiruvarur, he composed on every deity in the Tiruvarur temple complex including Tyagaraja (an amsham of Lord Shiva), the presiding deity, Nilotpalambal, his consort, and the Goddess Kamalambal an independent deity of high tantric significance in the same temple complex. This is when he composed the famous Kamalamba Navavarna kritis, filled with exemplary sahityas on the deities of the Sri Chakra which proved to be the showcase of his compositions. These navavaranams were in all the eight declensions of the Sanskrit language and are sung as a highlight of Guruguha Jayanti celebrated every year. He continued to display his prowess by composing the Navagraha Kritis in praise of the nine planets. The sahitya of the songs reflect a profound knowledge of the Mantra and Jyotisha sastras. The Nilotpalamba Kritis is another classic set of compositions which revived dying ragas like Narayanagaula, Purvagaula, and Chayagaula.

Death and legacy

Muthuswami Dikshitar died on 21 October 1835 at Ettayapuram. He had no children. A samadhi was erected at Ettayapuram in his memory and attracts musicians and admirers of his art.

Muthuswami Dikshitar's brothers Chinnaswami (1778–) and Balaswami Dikshitar (1786–1858) were also noted musicians. Chinnaswami composed some kritis while Balaswami adapted and pioneered the use of the Western violin in Carnatic music. The two of them were primarily vocalists and performed together as a duo singing Muthuswami's compositions. Balaswami's grandson was the composer and scholar, Subbarama Dikshitar (1839–1906). In his Sangeeta Sampradaya Pradarshini, Subbarama records 229 of Muthuswami Dikshitar's kritis.

Dikshitar's disciples included a number of renowned artists who carried forward his tradition. They included the Tanjore quartet brothers, Ponnayya Pillai, Vadivelu, Chinnayya and Sivanandam, the mridangam player Tambiyappa, the veena player Venkatarama Ayyar of Avudayarkoil, Tiruvarur Kamalam, Vallalarkoil Ammani, Kornad Ramaswamy, Tirukkadeyur Bharati, Thevvoor Subrahmania Ayyar, and the son of his Shyama Shastri, Subbaraya Shastri.

With the creativity and spiritual value embedded in his compositions, Dikshitar is considered one of the Trinity of Carnatic music alongside his two contemporaries from Tiruvarur, Tyagaraja and Shyama Shastri. The Carnatic musician M Balamuralikrishna had composed a song in his honour in the raga Sucharitra, 'Cintayāmi Satatam Śrī Mudduswāmi Dīkṣitam'.

Compositions

His total compositions are about 450 to 500, most of which are very widely sung by musicians today in Carnatic music concerts. Most of his compositions are in Sanskrit and in the Krithi form, i.e., poetry set to music. Muthuswami Dikshitar travelled to many holy shrines throughout his life, and composed krithis on the deities and temples he visited. Dikshitar is considered to have composed on the widest range of deities for any composer.

Each of his compositions is unique and brilliantly crafted. The compositions are known for the depth and soulfulness of the melody — his visions of some of the ragas are still the final word on their structure. His Sanskrit lyrics are in praise of the temple deity, but Muthuswami introduces the Advaita thought seamlessly into his songs, resolving the inherent relationship between Advaita philosophy and polytheistic worship. His songs also contain much information about the history of the temple, and its background, thus preserving many customs followed in these old shrines. Another noticeable feature in his compositions are the proficient rhyming of lines in the lyrics.

Muthuswami also undertook the project of composing in all the 72 Melakartha ragas, (in his Asampurna Mela scheme) thereby providing a musical example for many rare and lost ragas. Also, he was the pioneer in composing samashti charanam krithis (songs in which the main stanza or pallavi is followed by only one stanza, unlike the conventional two). Dikshitar was a master of tala and is the only composer to have kritis in all the seven basic talas of the Carnatic scheme. Dikshitar shows his skill in Sanskrit by composing in all the eight declensions.

For richness of raga bhava, sublimity of their philosophic contents and for the grandeur of the sahitya, the songs of Dikshitar stand unsurpassed.

Muthuswami Dikshitar composed many kritis in groups. Vatapi Ganapatim is regarded his best-known work.

Muthuswami Dikshitar composed one song (Shri Kantimatim Shankara Yuvatim Shri Guruguhajananim Vandeham. Samashti Charanam Hrîmkâra Bîjâkâra vadanâm Hiranya manimaya Shôbhâ Sadanâm) on the Nellaiappar Temple goddess Kanthimathi Amman. This song is considered to be a rare song set in the rare raga. He is also said to have composed a Rama Ashtapathi along with Upanishad Brahmendral at Kanchipuram. This work has been lost.

At a young age, Dikshitar was also exposed to the music of the Western bands at Fort St. George.  At a later stage, Dikshitar composed some forty songs to several (mostly western folk) tunes loosely adopted to ragas such as sankarabharaNa.  This corpus is now known as nottusvara sahitya (etym. nottusvara = "notes" swara). The influence of Celtic and Baroque styles in these compositions is quite evident (e.g., Sakthi Sahitha Ganapatim, to the tune of voulez-vous dancer, Varashiva Balam). There is an erroneous belief that these were composed at the behest of CP Brown, the Collector of Cuddappah. This is not possible as the two could have never met. Muthuswami Diskhitar had left Madras by 1799. Brown came to Madras only in 1817, learned Telugu in 1820 and moved to Cuddappah the same year.

See also

List of Carnatic composers

Notes

References

Sources

External links

Compositions of Dikshitar, with meanings.
Sruti Magazine, Mar 2013
Compositions of Dikshitar with meanings.
Muthusamy Dikshithar – A Creative Genius by Chitravina N Ravikiran
Statistics on Dikshitar's Compositions
Sri Muthuswamy Dheekshidhar Adichuvatil Isaipayanam by Valayapettai R. Krishnan

Carnatic composers
1775 births
1835 deaths
People from Tiruvarur district